Otto Rauth (22 January 1914 – 9 September 1978) was an Italian ice hockey player. He competed in the men's tournament at the 1948 Winter Olympics.

References

External links
 

1914 births
1978 deaths
Olympic ice hockey players of Italy
Ice hockey players at the 1948 Winter Olympics
People from Davos